This is a list of locomotive builders by country, including current and defunct builders. Many of the companies changed names over time; this list attempts to give the most recognisable name, generally the one used for the longest time or during the company's best-known period.


Argentina

Active companies 
 Grupo Emepa
 Material Ferroviario S.A.

Defunct companies 
 Astarsa
 Fábrica Argentina de Locomotoras
 GAIA

Australia 
Australia imported its locomotives from the United Kingdom and United States until domestic production began, and even afterwards built many with U.S. and British mechanical equipment.

Active companies 
 Downer Rail, Cardiff, Maryborough & Newport
 UGL Rail, Broadmeadow formerly United Group Rail, United Goninan and A Goninan
Alstom, Ballarat, Newport, Epping, North Ryde, Perth, Brisbane

Defunct companies 
 AE Goodwin, Granville
 Avteq, Sunshine
 Cardiff Locomotive Workshops
 Chullora Railway Workshops
 Clyde Engineering, Granville, Kelso, Somerton, Eagle Farm, Rosewater & Forrestfield, taken over by Evans Deakin Industries July 1996, became part of Downer Rail in March 2001
 Comeng, Clyde, Dandenong & Bassendean
 EM Baldwin, Castle Hill (not the American company) - built mainly small sugar cane and mining tram engines
 English Electric Australia, Rocklea
 Evans, Anderson, Phelan & Co, Kangaroo Point
 Eveleigh Railway Workshops, Redfern
 Islington Railway Workshops
 James Martin & Co, Gawler
 Martin & King, Somerton
 Midland Railway Workshops, Perth
 Mine Technic Australia
 Morrison-Knudsen Australia
 National Railway Equipment Company, Islington
 North Ipswich Railway Workshops
 Perry Engineering, Mile End
 Phoenix Engine Company, Ipswich
 Springall & Frost, Ipswich
 Tulloch Limited, Rhodes
 Walkers Limited, Maryborough
 Bombardier Transportation Australia, Melbourne

Azerbaijan
 Baku Carriage Repair Factory
 Baku Metro
 STP-Wagon-Building Factory

Belgium

Active companies 
 Alstom Charleroi – formerly ACEC Transport
 Bombardier Transportation Brugge –  formerly BN-Eurorail, formerly La Brugeoise et Nivelles

Defunct companies 
 Ateliers de Tubize
 John Cockerill –  later Cockerill-Sambre
 Ateliers de la Meuse
 Société Anglo-Franco-Belge

Brazil
 
 Mafersa
 EIF
 EMD (Progress/ Caterpillar)
 Wabtech (antes GE)

Bulgaria
 Express Service

Canada

Active companies 
 Bombardier Transportation – Berlin-based division of Alstom (no locomotives produced in Canada) 
 Railpower Technologies – Vancouver, British Columbia – subsidiary of R.J. Corman Railroad Group since 2009

Defunct companies 
 Canadian Locomotive Company – Kingston, Ontario – Fairbanks-Morse (Canada) Ltd 1965 and ceased operations 1969
 General Motors Diesel Division – London, Ontario – later as Electro-Motive Diesel Canadian operations and ceased production by Progress Rail in 2012
 Montreal Locomotive Works – Montreal, Quebec – formerly part of American Locomotive Company, acquired by Bombardier Inc in 1975 but ended locomotive production 1985
 Urban Transportation Development Corporation – Toronto, Ontario – former Crown corporation

Chile 
 Casagrande Motori

China

Active companies 
 CRRC

Defunct companies 
 China CNR - merged into CRRC
 CSR Corporation Limited - merged into CRRC

Croatia
 Končar

Czech Republic
 ČKD (Českomoravská Kolben-Daněk)
 CZ LOKO
 Škoda Transportation
 Škoda Works

Denmark 
 ABB Scandia
 Frichs
 Pedershaab
 Triangel

Finland
 Lokomo
 Rautaruukki Oyj
 Saalasti Oy
 Škoda Transtech
 Tampella
 Valmet
 Valtionrautatiet (Finnish State Railways)

France

Commercial manufacturers
 Alcard, Buddicom et Cie.
 Alsthom (now Alstom)
 Anciens Établissements Cail – 1883–1898, became SFCM
 André Koechlin et Cie. – to SACM in 1872
 Ateliers du Nord de la France (ANF) – also known as Blanc-Misseron; acquired by Bombardier Transportation in 1989
 Brissonneau and Lotz – acquired by Alstom in 1972
 Buffault et Robatel 
 Charbonniers et Cie. 
 CFD 
 Compagnie des forges et aciéries de la marine et d'Homécourt
 Compagnie Electro-Méchanique – acquired by Alstom in 1985
 Compagnie générale de construction de locomotives  – , Nantes, founded 1917
 Corpet-Louvet – 1889–1952
 Etablissment Cavé – to Charbonniers et Cie. in 1854
 Etablissment Claprède 
 Fives-Lille – merged into Fives-Lille Cail in 1958
 Schneider et Cite. – now Schneider Electric
 Société Alsacienne de Constructions Mécaniques (SACM) 
  – 1836–1848, became Société J. F. Cail & Cie.
 Société de Construction des Batignolles, Paris – founded 1871, ceased locomotive production 1928, merged into Spie Batignolles in 1968
 Société française de constructions mécaniques (SFCM) – created in 1898, merged into Fives-Lille Cail in 1958
 Société Franco-Belge 
 Société J. F. Cail & Cie. – 1850–1883, became Anciens Établissements Cail
 Société Nouvelle des Forges et Chantiers de la Méditerranée

Railway company workshops
 Arles (1899–1904) – PLM
 La Chapelle, Paris – Chemins de Fer du Nord
 Épernay (1854–1970) – Chemins de fer de l'Est
 Hellennes, Lille – Chemins de Fer du Nord
 Ivry – PLM
 Nîmes (1856–1858) – Chemin de fer de Lyon à la Méditerranée, later Chemins de fer de Paris à Lyon et à la Méditerranée (PLM)
 Ouillins (1863–1914) – PLM
 Paris (1909–1920) – PLM
 Sotteville, Rouen – Chemins de fer de l'Ouest from 1909)
 Vilnius locomotive repair depot

Georgia

Germany

Active companies 
 Bombardier Transportation
 Fahrzeugtechnik Dessau
 Interlock steam
 
 Schalker Eisenhütte Maschinenfabrik
 Schöma
 Siemens Mobility
 Voith
 Vossloh
 Windhoff

Defunct companies 
 Adtranz – now part of Bombardier
 AEG – now part of Bombardier
 AG Vulcan Stettin
 Berliner Maschinenbau
 Gmeinder
 Hanomag
 Henschel - acquired by Adtranz
 Hohenzollern Locomotive Works
 Krauss-Maffei
 Krupp
 LEW Hennigsdorf – formerly Borsig Lokomotiv Werke, formerly AEG, now part of Bombardier
 Maschinenbau Kiel (MaK) - acquired by Siemens, now part of Vossloh
 Maschinenfabrik Esslingen
 Maschinenfabrik L. Schwartzkopff
 Orenstein & Koppel
 Schichau-Werke
 Waggonfabrik Talbot - now part of Bombardier

Greece
 Basileiades
 Skaramagas Hellenic Shipyards Co.
Eleuisis Shipyards
Siemens Hellas
Kioleidis

Hungary
 Ganz
 MÁVAG

India 

 Integral Coach Factory
 Bharat Heavy Electricals Limited
 Banaras Locomotive Works (BLW)
 Chittaranjan Locomotive Works (CLW)
 Golden Rock Railway Workshop
 Bharat Earth Movers Limited
 Ovis Equipment Pvt Ltd.
 Railway Engineering Works
 SAN Engineering & Locomotive Co. Ltd.
 Medha Servo Drives Pvt Ltd.
 Patiala Locomotive Works
 National Railway Equipment (NRE)
 Raajratna Energy Holdings Private Limited (REHPL)
 Republic Industrial & Technical Services
 TATA Engineering and Locomotive Company (TELCO)
 Titagarh Wagons
 Electric Locomotive Factory, Madhepura
 GE Diesel Locomotive Works, Marhaura

Indonesia
 Industri Kereta Api

Iran

 MLC (Mapna Locomotive Engineering and Manufacturing Company)
 Wagon Pars

Italy

Active companies 
 Alstom Ferroviaria S.p.A. – Savigliano
 Bombardier Transportation Italy – Vado Ligure
 Hitachi Rail Italy (formerly Ansaldo Breda)
 Firema Trasporti
 Ipe
 Valente

Defunct companies 
 Fiat Ferroviaria
 Officine Casaralta
 Società Italiana Ernesto Breda - Later Breda Costruzioni Ferroviarie, merged with Ansaldo as AnsaldoBreda, now Hitachi Rail Italy
 Gio. Ansaldo & C. - Merged into AnsaldoBreda, now Hitachi Rail Italy

Japan
 Hitachi
 Kawasaki Heavy Industries Rolling Stock Company
 Mitsubishi Heavy Industries
 Toshiba
 Nippon Sharyo
 J-TREC (former Tokyu Car Co.)
 Kinki Sharyo
 Alna Sharyo
 Niigata Transys

Latvia
 Rīgas Vagonbūves Rūpnīca

Malaysia
 SMH Rail Sdn Bhd

Netherlands

Active companies
 Bemo, Warmenhuizen

Defunct companies
 Allan
 N.V. Heemaf
 Spoorijzer
 Werkspoor

New Zealand

Active companies
 Kiwirail
 A & G Price
 Scott Engineering

Defunct companies
 Dispatch & Garlick
 E.W. Mills
 Gibbons and Harris
 Union Foundry
 OW Smith

North Korea 
Kim Chong-t'ae Electric Locomotive Works

Pakistan
 Pakistan Locomotive Factory
 Equinox

Philippines

Defunct companies
 Manila Railroad Company's Caloocan Works — The Manila Railroad once made its own railmotors at the Caloocan yards from 1924 to 1949. It also assembled two 630 class 2-8-2 locomotives with parts acquired from the War Assets Administration in 1948.
 Ramcar, Inc. — Also constructed and assembled railmotors alongside the MRR. Although it still survives as the Ramcar Group of Companies, its rolling stock business ended during World War II.

Poland

Active companies 
 Bombardier Transportation
 Bumar
 Fablok
 H. Cegielski (Poznań)
 Newag
 Pesa

Defunct companies 
 Pafawag – now part of Bombardier

Portugal
 Sorefame - acquired by ABB, then ADtranz, now part of Bombardier

Romania
 Electroputere – Craiova http://relocsa.ro/
 FAUR – Bucharest
 Promat – Craiova
 Softronic – Craiova
 UCM Reşiţa – Reşiţa
Romania Euroest S.A. – Constanța

Russia

Active Companies
 Kambarka Engineering Works
 Kirov Plant
 
 Sinara Group
 
 Lyudinovsky Locomotive Plant
 Ural Locomotives
 Transmashholding
 Bryansk Machine-Building Plant
 Demikhovo Machinebuilding Plant
 Kolomna Locomotive Works
 Metrowagonmash
 Novocherkassk Electric Locomotive Factory (NEVZ)

Defunct Companies

Serbia
 Goša FOM
 Mašinska Industrija Niš (MIN)

Slovakia
 Avokov
 ZOŠ - Vrútky

South Africa 
 DCD Group
 Girdlestone Steam
 Transnet Engineering
 Union Carriage & Wagon
 Grindrod Locomotives
Prof Pty Ltd Engineers

South Korea
 Hyundai Rotem
 Woojin Industrial Systems

Spain

Active companies 
 CAF
 Stadler
 Talgo

Defunct companies 
 ATEINSA. Became part of the GEC-Alstom group (now Alstom) in 1989.
 Babcock & Wilcox
 Euskalduna
  (MTM). Became part of the GEC-Alstom group (now Alstom) in 1989.
 MACOSA. Became part of the GEC-Alstom group (now Alstom) in 1989, until 2005 when it became part of the Vossloh group. The plant was sold to Stadler in 2015.

Sweden
 ASEA – later ABB Group, later Adtranz; rail business sold to Bombardier in 2001
Helsingborgs Mekaniska Verkstad
Ljunggrens Verkstad
 Munktells Mekaniska Verkstad
 Nydqvist & Holm AB (NOHAB)

Switzerland 
 Brown, Boveri & Cie  – later ABB Group, later Adtranz; rail business sold to Bombardier in 2001
 DLM AG, Dampflokomotiv- und Maschinenfabrik AG
 Ferdinand Steck Maschinenfabrik
 SIG
 Stadler Rail
 Swiss Locomotive and Machine Works (SLM) – closed in 2001, parts taken over by Stadler Rail, DLM and Prose

Taiwan
 Taiwan Rolling Stock Company

Defunct companies
 Tang Eng Iron Works (Manufacturing of rolling stock has been ceased and transferred to Taiwan Rolling Stock Co.)

Turkey
 EUROTEM
 TÜDEMSAŞ
 Tülomsaş
 TÜVASAŞ
 TÜRKARGE

Ukraine 
 Kriukiv Railway Car Manufacturing Plant
 Luhanskteplovoz
 Kharkiv Locomotive Factory (KhPZ)

United Kingdom 
Historically, major railways in the United Kingdom built the vast majority of their locomotives.  Commercial locomotive builders were called upon when requirements exceeded the railway works' capacity, but these orders were generally to the railways' own designs.  British commercial builders concentrated on industrial users, small railway systems, and to a large extent the export market.  British-built locomotives were exported around the world, especially to the British Empire.  With the almost total disappearance of British industrial railways, the shrinking of the export market and much reduced demand from Britain's railways, few British locomotive builders survive.

Active companies 
 Alan Keef  – narrow-gauge diesel/steam locomotives, permanent way
 Bombardier Transportation – electric multiple units, diesel multiple units; Derby
 Brush-Barclay – Kilmarnock; part of Wabtec
 Brush Traction  – diesel and electric locomotives; Loughborough; part of Wabtec
 Clayton Equipment Company – diesel/electric/battery locomotives
 Cowans Sheldon – railway cranes 
 Exmoor Steam Railway  – narrow-gauge steam locomotives
 Ffestiniog Railway – narrow-gauge steam locomotives and carriages
 Hitachi Rail Europe – diesel and electric locomotives, carriages
 Hunslet Engine Company – diesel locomotives, narrow-gauge steam locomotives; part of Wabtec
 Rhino Industries – narrow-gauge diesel/steam locomotives, new build, maintenance
 Severn Lamb – narrow gauge diesel/steam/steam outline locomotives, carriages, and track infrastructure
 Southern Locomotives Ltd
 Steam Loco Design
 TMA Engineering  – narrow-gauge diesel locomotives

Defunct companies 
 5AT project –  steam for the 21st century
 Andrew Barclay Sons & Co.
 Armstrong Whitworth
 Aveling and Porter
 Avonside Engine Company
 Baguley Cars - acquired by Drewry Car Co in 1962
 William Beardmore & Company
 Beyer, Peacock & Company
 Birmingham Railway Carriage & Wagon Company
 Black, Hawthorn & Co
 British Rail Engineering Limited
 British Electric Vehicles
 British Thomson-Houston
 Cravens – multiple units/coaching stock
 D Wickham & Co
 Davies & Metcalfe
 De Winton
 Drewry Car Co
 Dübs & Co –  to North British Locomotive Company in 1903
 English Electric
 F. C. Hibberd & Co.
 Fletcher, Jennings & Co.
 Fox, Walker and Company – became Peckett and Sons in 1880
 George England and Co.
 Gloucester Railway Carriage & Wagon Company  – multiple units/coaching stock
 Grant, Ritchie and Company
 Greenwood & Batley (Greenbat)
 Hawthorn Leslie & Company – locomotive business sold to Robert Stephenson & Hawthorns in 1937
 Hudswell Clarke
 John Fowler & Co
 Kerr, Stuart and Company
 Kitson & Co
 Manning Wardle
 Metro-Cammell (multiple units/coaching stock)
 Metropolitan-Vickers
 Midland Railway Carriage and Wagon Company
 Motor Rail
 Muir-Hill
 Nasmyth, Gaskell and Company
 Neilson and Company – became Neilson Reid & Company in 1898; to North British Locomotive Company in 1903
 North British Locomotive Company
 Peckett and Sons
 Pressed Steel Company – multiple units/coaching stock
 R&W Hawthorn – to 1870
 Ruston & Hornsby
 Sentinel Waggon Works
 Robert Stephenson & Company – became Robert Stephenson & Hawthorns in 1937
 Robert Stephenson & Hawthorns
 Sharp, Roberts & Company – became Sharp Brothers & Company in 1843; Sharp, Stewart & Company in 1852; to North British Locomotive Company in 1903
 Stephen Lewin
 Thomas Hill
 Tulk and Ley
 Vulcan Foundry
 WG Bagnall
 Walker Brothers – narrow gauge for Ireland
 Wingrove & Rogers
 Yorkshire Engine Company

See also:
 List of British railway-owned locomotive builders
 List of early British private locomotive manufacturers

United States

Active companies 
 Brookville Equipment Corporation
 Process Locomotives
 Colmar
 Electro-Motive Diesel
 GE Transportation
 Harsco Corporation
 Katiland Trains
 Kloke Locomotive Works
Knoxville Locomotive Works (KLW)
 Merrick Light Railway
 Motive Power & Equipment Solutions
 National Railway Equipment Company
 NS Juniata Locomotive Shop (Thoroughbred Mechanical Services)
 Progress Rail
 Quality Rail Service Corporation
 Railserve Leaf
 RELCO Locomotives
 Republic Transportation Systems(Republic Locomotive)
 Siemens Corporation  -subsidiary of Siemens AG
 Train Rides Unlimited
 Tweetsie Railroad  -official source for Crown Metal Products parts
 Wabtec
 Western Train Co Amusement Rides Manufacturer specializing in Locomotives, Carousels, and Railroad Installation
 Wiese

Defunct companies 
In addition to these, many railroads operating steam locomotives built locomotives in their shops.  Notable examples include the Baltimore and Ohio Railroad's Mount Clare Shops, Norfolk and Western's Roanoke Shops, Pennsylvania Railroad's Altoona Works and the Southern Pacific's Sacramento Shops. An estimate of total steam locomotive production in the United States is about 175,000 engines, including nearly 70,000 by Baldwin.

 Altoona Machine Shops (PRR)
 American Locomotive Company (ALCO)
 Amoskeag Locomotive Works
 Appomattox Locomotive Works – operated by Uriah Wells
 Atlas Car and Manufacturing Company
 Baldwin Locomotive Works – later known as Baldwin-Lima-Hamilton
 Bell Locomotive Works –  New York City and Bloomsburg, Pennsylvania
 Brooks Locomotive Works - to ALCO in 1901
 Budd Company
 Burr and Ettinger
 Miniature Railway Company – also known as Cagney Bros.
 Cincinnati Locomotive Works – also known as Harkness and as Moore & Richardson
 Climax Manufacturing Company
 Cooke Locomotive and Machine Works - began as Danforth Locomotive & Machine Company, later Danforth, Cooke, & Company, to ALCO in 1901
 Covington Locomotive Works
 Crown Metal Products
 Custom Fabricators
 Davenport Locomotive Works
 Denmead
 Dickson Manufacturing Company - to ALCO in 1901
 Dunkirk Engineering Company
 Eastwick and Harrison
 Euclid Road Machinery Company
 Fairbanks-Morse
 Globe Locomotive Works
 Glover Locomotive Works
 Grant Locomotive Works
 H.K. Porter, Inc. – Smith & Porter, later Porter, Bell & Co.
 Heisler Locomotive Works
 Hicks Locomotive and Car Works
 Hinkley Locomotive Works
 Hurlbut Amusement Co.
 Ingalls Shipbuilding
 Kentucky Locomotive Works
 Lancaster Locomotive Works
 Lawrence Machine Shop
 Lima Locomotive Works – later Lima-Hamilton, then Baldwin-Lima-Hamilton
 Locks and Canals Machine Shop
 Lowell Machine Shop
 Manchester Locomotive Works - to ALCO in 1901
 Mason Machine Works
 McQueen Locomotive Works
 Mount Savage Locomotive Works
 Nashville Manufacturing Company
 New Castle Manufacturing Company
 New Jersey Locomotive and Machine Company – began as Swinburne, Smith and Company
 New York Locomotive Works – also known as Breese, Kneeland & Company
 Niles and Company
 Norris Locomotive Works
 Ottaway Amusement Company
 Pittsburgh Locomotive and Car Works - to ALCO in 1901
 Plymouth Locomotive Works
 Portland Company
 Rhode Island Locomotive Works - to ALCO in 1901
 Richmond Locomotive Works - to ALCO in 1901
 Roanoke East End Shops
 Rogers Locomotive and Machine Works – began as Rogers, Ketchum & Grosvenor, to ALCO in 1905
 Rome Locomotive Works – New York
 Ross Winans Locomotive Works
 Schenectady Locomotive Works - later became American Locomotive Company (ALCO)
 St. Louis Car Company
 Swinburne, Smith and Company
 Sygnet Rail Technologies 
 T. H. Paul & Sons
 Talbott and Brother Iron Works
 Taunton Locomotive Manufacturing Company
 Tredegar Iron Works
 Union Iron Works
 United Aircraft
 Virginia Locomotive and Car Works – also known as Smith & Perkins
 Vulcan Iron Works
 Wasatch Railroad Contractors  – builder of brand-new  gauge Cagney replica steam locomotives
 West Point Foundry
 Westinghouse Electric Corporation (WEMCO)
 Whitcomb Locomotive Works
 Ernst Wiener Co., New York
 Wilmarth

See also

 List of rolling stock manufacturers
 List of tram builders
 List of railway companies

References 

List of manufacturers
Manufacturers
Locomotive manufacturers